The Wolverhampton Olympique is a unique Motorcycle Speedway event that is hosted annually. It was first run in October 1966 by the Newcastle Diamonds club. At the time both Newcastle Diamonds and Wolverhampton Wolves were owned by the same promoter Mike Parker. In 1969 Parker sold his interest in Newcastle Diamonds and a number of his assets were transferred to Wolverhampton Wolves, two of which were the Olympique and speedway rider Ole Olsen.

With the closure of Wolverhampton Speedway in 1980 the meeting was transferred to Birmingham. It only last two seasons and when Wolves re-opened in 1984 Peter Adams brought it back to Wolverhampton.

Rules
Scoring Points: First 3, Second 2, Third 1, Fourth 0.
 All riders have five rides and in the first set of heats all riders start from the gate.
 Subsequent heats are handicapped:
 Last in previous heat: Tapes.
 Third in previous heat: 10 metres.
 Second in previous heat 15 metres.
 First in previous heat 20 metres.
 All riders go of gate positions red (1), Blue (2), White (3), Yellow (4) except those starting from the tapes as they go off gate 1.
 Any rider deemed guilty of gaining unfair advantage from the start or breaking the tape are handicapped 10 metres.
 Reserves will start from scratch.
 The winner of the Olympic is the top scorer over the 20 heats.
 A run off is available for anyone tied for any podium position.

Medalists

Wolverhampton Olympique

Results by Rider

References
Much of this information has been taken from the Wolverhampton Wolves Olympique programme dated 11/10/16.

Motorcycling events
Sport in Wolverhampton
Recurring sporting events established in 1966
Speedway competitions in the United Kingdom